Dastilbe is an extinct genus of prehistoric bony fish from the Aptian.

Species 
 Dastilbe elongatus Silva Santos, 1947
 Dastilbe crandalli Jordan, 1910

Description 
It was probably an anadromous fish, tolerant of hypersalinity and subjected to frequent mass mortality. Larger individuals of this predatory fish fed on small fishes and probably they were also cannibalistic.

Distribution 
Dastilbe was a primitive gonorynchiform fish widespread in Gondwanaland. Fossils of this fish have been found in the Aptian stage of the Lower Cretaceous Cabo, Codo and Crato Formations of northeastern Brazil and in the Lower Cretaceous of Africa.

Taxonomy 
The type species Dastilbe crandalli was described by the American ichthyologist David Starr Jordan from specimens collected in Brazil, up to four species have been suggested as comprising Dastilbe but other authorities have suggested that the genus is monotypic, comprising a single phenotypically plastic species D. crandalli.

See also 

 Prehistoric fish
 List of prehistoric bony fish

References 

Prehistoric ray-finned fish genera
Early Cretaceous fish
Aptian life
Prehistoric fish of Africa
Prehistoric fish of South America
Early Cretaceous animals of South America
Cretaceous Brazil
Fossils of Brazil
Crato Formation
Fossil taxa described in 1910
Taxa named by David Starr Jordan